Knocked Loose is an American metalcore band from Oldham County, Kentucky, formed in 2013 and currently signed to Pure Noise Records. The band released its first studio album, Laugh Tracks, in September 2016 through Pure Noise Records.

History 
Knocked Loose's career in its current form began in 2013, but Garris has stated that he started playing with several of the band's current members in 2011 or 2012.

Their first studio material was an EP titled Pop Culture, released in 2014 on Little Heart Records.

In 2015, Knocked Loose released a split with Damaged Goods on No Luck Records (and digitally via Little Heart).

In the Spring of 2016, Knocked Loose supported Counterparts on their headlining tour. Gideon & Expire also joined up as support. The band then embarked on a Summer tour supporting The Acacia Strain on their 2016 Common Vision Tour. Oceano, Culture Killer and To the Wind also joined up on the tour. Then in the fall, the band supported Stick to Your Guns on their Better Ash than Dust tour. Stray from the Path and Expire joined up on the lineup as support.

In 2016, the band announced their first studio album, titled Laugh Tracks, would be released by Pure Noise Records, who they had signed to earlier that year. The album was released on September 16, 2016. On August 9, 2016, Knocked Loose premiered a new song off their upcoming album titled Oblivions Peak. On May 31, 2017, the band released a music video for two combined songs from Laugh Tracks, "Billy No Mates / Counting Worms", with the video beginning with Billy No Mates and instantaneously moving into Counting Worms.

On June 6, 2017, Knocked Loose were announced to be supporting Every Time I Die along with Hollow Earth for a late 2017 tour of the United States, spanning September and October. A month later, in July 2017, the band announced a November UK tour, also supporting Every Time I Die but instead playing alongside Canadian hardcore band Comeback Kid for a select few dates. In the summer of 2017, Knocked Loose played every date of the Vans Warped Tour on the Full Sail stage alongside bands such as Trophy Eyes, Boston Manor, and Movements. Knocked Loose opened up for Eighteen Visions for two shows in December 2017 with Old Wounds and Tourniquet. In late 2017, the band announced their first US headlining tour for early 2018 with support from hardcore bands Terror and Jesus Piece, and label-mates Stone. However, before the tour, after members of Stone were accused of sexual assault allegations, Knocked Loose dropped them from the tour and replaced them with Year of the Knife.

Most of the dates of their first headliner were sold out which allowed them to open for Parkway Drive and for Thy Art Is Murder on their European tours and also to play a few dates on the main stage of the last Warped Tour.

In the fall of 2018, Knocked Loose opened up for Beartooth on their Disease tour with Sylar. Knocked Loose then embarked on a headliner in the Spring of 2019. The Acacia Strain, Harm's Way, Sanction and Higher Power all joined up as support. Knocked Loose then supported A Day to Remember in the Summer of 2019 with Boston Manor.

Knocked Loose's next record, A Different Shade of Blue was released on August 23, 2019. In support of the new record, the band embarked on a massive USA headliner throughout the fall of 2019. Stick to Your Guns, Rotting Out, Candy and SeeYouSpaceCowboy all joined up on the tour as support.

Knocked Loose went on a late Summer headliner with Gatecreeper, Magnitude and Kharma. The band then opened up for Gojira on their Fall 2021 tour with Alien Weaponry.

In October 2021, the band, without any prior notice, released their EP A Tear In The Fabric Of Life. The concept record documents the "story of someone wading through ‘extreme grief'". An animated short film, which accompanies the entire span of the EP, was released at the same time. It was directed by swedish Director Magnus Jonsson. The release, as well as the short film, gained mostly positive reviews. Its song "God Knows" was elected by Loudwire as the 30th best metal song of 2021.

Musical style 
Knocked Loose have been categorized under several sub-genres by the media and publications alike, including metalcore, hardcore punk, and beatdown hardcore. New Noise, when reviewing their debut album Laugh Tracks, described the band's sound as being akin to "Comeback Kid at their heaviest with some added doses of Slayer riffs and Code Orange-style malice". Bryan Garris, the band's lead vocalist, has described their sound as being "sandwiched between hardcore and metalcore", although he has stated that the band's intention was to produce a diverse sound that was difficult to categorize. Knocked Loose have been credited as one of the forerunners of the first-wave metalcore "revival" scene of the late 2010s, alongside bands such as Code Orange, Counterparts, Kublai Khan, Varials and Jesus Piece .

As is common within the metalcore and hardcore punk genres, Knocked Loose incorporate slow-tempo breakdowns into their music.

Members 

Current members
Bryan Garris – lead vocals (2013–present)
Isaac Hale – lead guitar, backing vocals (2013–present)
Kevin Otten – bass (2013–present)
Kevin "Pacsun" Kaine – drums (2015–present)
Nicko Calderon – rhythm guitar, backing vocals (2020–present)

Former members
 Cole Crutchfield – rhythm guitar, backing vocals (2015–2020)

Timeline

Discography 
Studio albums
Laugh Tracks (2016, Pure Noise)
A Different Shade of Blue (2019, Pure Noise)

EPs and splits
Pop Culture (2014, Little Heart)
 Knocked Loose/Damaged Goods (2015, No Luck/Little Heart)
 Mistakes Like Fractures  (2019, Pure Noise)
 A Tear in the Fabric of Life  (2021, Pure Noise)

Demos

 Manipulator (demo) (2013)

Singles

"The Have Nots"
"Manipulator"
"SS" (2014, Little Heart)
"Deadringer"
"Oblivion's Peak"
"Billy No Mates / Counting Worms"
"Mistakes Like Fractures"
"...And Still I Wander South"
"Trapped in the Grasp of a Memory"

References

External links 
 

Metalcore musical groups from Kentucky
People from Oldham County, Kentucky
2013 establishments in Kentucky
Musical groups established in 2013
Pure Noise Records artists
Musical quintets